Arnold Anthony "Arnie" Galiffa (January 29, 1927 – September 5, 1978) was a quarterback for the National Football League and Canadian Football League.  He won 11 varsity letters at West Point and served with distinction as an officer in the Korean War.

References

External links

1927 births
1978 deaths
All-American college football players
American football quarterbacks
United States Army personnel of the Korean War
Army Black Knights football players
Army Black Knights men's basketball players
New York Giants players
San Francisco 49ers players
BC Lions players
Toronto Argonauts players
People from Donora, Pennsylvania
Players of American football from Pennsylvania
United States Army officers
Canadian football quarterbacks
American men's basketball players
Military personnel from Pennsylvania